West Library is a station on the Port Authority of Allegheny County's light rail network, nearby the Library neighborhood of South Park, Pennsylvania. Primarily a park and ride stop, it features 115 spaces, designed to facilitate the flow of South Park commuters to Downtown Pittsburgh.

History
A stop was established at West Library when the Pittsburgh Railways interurban line from Charleroi to Pittsburgh was opened through South Park on September 12, 1903. Passengers initially changed at Castle Shannon to continue their journey to Downtown via the Pittsburgh and Castle Shannon Railroad. It was cut back to Library in 1953 and was converted from PCC operation to light rail in 1988.

References

External links

Station from Library Road from Google Maps Street View

Port Authority of Allegheny County stations
Railway stations in the United States opened in 1903
Silver Line (Pittsburgh)